Belemnia eryx is a moth of the subfamily Arctiinae. It was described by Johan Christian Fabricius in 1775. It is found in Venezuela, Bolivia, Argentina, Brazil, Colombia and Peru.

References

Arctiini
Moths described in 1775
Taxa named by Johan Christian Fabricius